Gogu Neagoe is one of the most famous and appreciated cartoonists in Romania
is a member of the Romanian Association of Professional Caricature since 2006, and since 2008 is a member of the International Association of Fine Arts in Germany UNESCO. He has participated in numerous national and international painting and caricature festivals, and his works are in private collections in Romania and abroad.

The artist's cartoons are exhibited in art museums in Australia, USA, Los Angeles, Iran, France, Italy, Germany, China, Japan, Bulgaria, Belgium, Greece.

In 2013, the cartoonist donated 4 painted works, worth 15,000 euros, to a charity event for children with health problems and the poor.

World records
In 2004, Neagoe entered the Guinness World Records for the first time by doing 131 caricatures  through the phone, without ever seeing the subject.

Gogu Neagoe entered the Guinness World Records a second time by drawing celebrities and politicians in 1,200,000 images on 12 36mm film rolls, measuring 2 km in length, and weighing 3 tons.

Notes

Living people
1976 births
Romanian caricaturists
Romanian editorial cartoonists